Ljubo Baranin (Serbian Cyrillic: Љубо Баранин; born 25 August 1986) is a Serbian professional footballer who plays as a defender new signing for Kelantan in Premier League, Malaysia. He is well known for his long-range powerful throw-in ability.

Club career
Born in Belgrade, Baranin came through the youth ranks of Železnik, before making his senior debut with Dorćol in the 2003–04 season. He also played for Beograd from 2005 to 2007. In the summer of 2009, Baranin signed with Bežanija. He spent two seasons at the club, before moving abroad and joining Azerbaijani club Gabala in the summer of 2009. After three seasons there, Baranin switched to fellow Premier League club Kapaz in the summer of 2012. He left the club after only two months, before returning to his homeland to play with Novi Pazar in the top flight of Serbian football.

In the summer of 2013, Baranin returned to his former club Bežanija. He spent one season there, before moving to Radnik Surdulica in July 2014. In his first season with the club, Baranin helped them win promotion to the nation's top flight for the first time in the club's history. He again moved abroad in October 2015, penning a one-year contract plus a one-year option with Kuantan FA in Malaysia.

International career
In late 2007, after previously being called up to the squad on one occasion, Baranin made one appearance as a substitute for the Serbia U-21.

Statistics

Honours
Radnik Surdulica
 Serbian First League: 2014–15

References

External links
 

Association football defenders
Azerbaijan Premier League players
Expatriate footballers in Azerbaijan
Expatriate footballers in Malaysia
FK Bežanija players
FK Novi Pazar players
FK Radnik Surdulica players
Gabala FC players
Kapaz PFK players
Serbia under-21 international footballers
Serbian expatriate footballers
Serbian footballers
Serbian expatriate sportspeople in Azerbaijan
Serbian expatriate sportspeople in Malaysia
Serbian First League players
Serbian SuperLiga players
Footballers from Belgrade
1986 births
Living people